Deh-e Khvajeh or Deh Khvajeh may refer to:
 Deh-e Khvajeh, Kuhbanan, Kerman Province
 Deh Khvajeh, Zarand, Kerman Province
 Deh-e Khvajeh, South Khorasan